Vasilios Vallianos (born 11 September 1988) is a Greek professional footballer who plays as a left-back.

Honours
Enosis Neon Paralimni
Cypriot Second Division: 2014–15

References

1988 births
Living people
Greek footballers
Greece youth international footballers
Greek expatriate footballers
Super League Greece players
Football League (Greece) players
Regionalliga players
Cypriot First Division players
Cypriot Second Division players
AEK Athens F.C. players
Anagennisi Karditsa F.C. players
Panachaiki F.C. players
VfB Lübeck players
AO Chania F.C. players
Enosis Neon Paralimni FC players
OFI Crete F.C. players
Apollon Smyrnis F.C. players
Doxa Drama F.C. players
Association football defenders
Footballers from Agrinio